Crescent is an unincorporated community and census-designated place in Iberville Parish, Louisiana, United States. Its population was 959 as of the 2010 census.

Geography

Demographics

References

Unincorporated communities in Iberville Parish, Louisiana
Unincorporated communities in Louisiana
Census-designated places in Iberville Parish, Louisiana
Census-designated places in Louisiana